Humiliated and Insulted is a 1990 Soviet drama film directed by Andrei Eshpai.

Plot 
The film tells about two families ravaged by the aristocrat Prince Valkovsky. The film shows the relationship of Natasha Ikhmeneva and son of Valkovsky, tells about the fate of the young writer Ivan Petrovich, in love with Natasha, as well as an orphan, Nellie.

Cast 
 Nastassja Kinski as Natasha  (voiced by Anna Kamenkova)
 Nikita Mikhalkov as Prince Valkovsky
 Anastasiya Vyazemskaya as Nellie
 Sergey Perelygin as  Ivan Petrovich
 Viktor Rakov as Alyosha
 Aleksandr Abdulov		 as Masloboev
 Boris Romanov as Nikolay  Ikhmenev  
 Lyudmila Polyakova as Anna Ikhmeneva
 Varvara Shabalina as Anna Trifonovna Bubnova
 Valentina Klyagina as Mavra
 Heinz Brown as doctor

See also
 Humiliated and Insulted

References

External links 
 

1990 films
1990s Russian-language films
Soviet drama films
1990 drama films
Films based on works by Fyodor Dostoyevsky
Gorky Film Studio films
Films about writers
Italian drama films
Swiss drama films